Erwin Panofsky (1892–1968) was a German art historian who worked in the U.S.

Panofsky may also refer to:

 Panofsky Prize, awarded in the field of particle physics

People with the surname
 Aaron Panofsky, American sociologist
 Dora Panofsky (1885-1965), German-American art historian
 Wolfgang K. H. Panofsky, German-American physicist

See also
 Panovsky, a rural locality in Vladimir Oblast, Russia